Club Deportivo Atlético Balboa, commonly known as Atlético Balboa or simply Balboa, was a Salvadoran football club.  The team formerly played in La Unión.

History

Foundation
The foundation of Atletico Balboa occurred in 1950 in La Union.
Mauro "El Turco" Granados, Simón Reyes, Paulino Cáceres, Pablo Rubio, Rodolfo Guzmán, Carlos Villalta, Carlos Juárez, René Pantoja, Luis Ávila, Chico Osorio, Juan Guevara, Chico Ruíz and Timoteo Hernández were the original members of the team.
The team was intended to be a baseball team, but it was changed to a football team.
The club was named "Balboa" after the Panamanian balboa and its first match was played against the Honduran team América de Choluteca.
The team's first colours were white with green diagonal stripes which were soon changed by the team's president Ricardo Flores to black and red.

Primera División
After becoming champions of the Segunda División in 1998, Atlético Balboa ascended to the Salvadoran Primera División where in their first season they finished runner-up while being coached by Mario Martínez and Óscar Benítez. The team's player lineup that season included Franklin Webster and Elvis Perreira.

Irregular way
The team's results and goal count declined between 1999 and 2001. During this time the team was coached by Óscar Benítez, Saúl Molina and Juan Quarterone. Luciano Suárez, Manuel Díaz, Camilo Bonilla and Carlos Edgar Villareal played for Balboa in this period.

Days of crisis
The team had just started the 2002–2003 season when the team ran into economic and performance problems. Juan Quarterone was replaced by the Paraguayan Nelson Brizuela.
Under Brizuela, the team was only able to achieve 3 draws from 6 games. Brizuela was soon replaced by Argentine-Italian Carlos Barone whose team's last four games almost got them relegated but in the end Dragón had a poorer record. Atlético Balboa purchased many foreign players during the season but the only successful one was the Colombian Carlos Asprilla. Webster, the highest scoring player from the team was sold to San Salvador F.C. The club then changed its coach several times during the 2003-2004 season, with Costa Rican Manuel Solano, Gabriel Avedissian and Paulo Roberto de Oliveira serving as coach at various points in time. These coaches, except for assistant coach Jesús Fuentes, all failed to produce a high number of wins.

Almost glory
After the events of 2002-2004 season Balboa advanced in the rankings of the Primera División. The team finished in second place in the 2006-2007 while being coached by Juan Quarterone and Jorge Alberto García. Then, tension between the board and the two coaches divided the club. The team, including Colombian player Henry Vargas did not participate in the UNCAF tournament due to losing playoff to C.D. Luis Ángel Firpo. However the next season Atlético Balboa was relegated from the Primera División when they lost to C.D. Vista Hermosa.

Current history
The club was promoted to the Salvadoran Primera División again after defeating Juventud Independiente in the 2008 season. Two years of moderate success followed under Guatemalan coach Carlos Alberto Mijangos and Argentine coach Roberto Gamarra, during which the team came close to entering the finals series in both seasons. However, financial problems appeared again and after two subsequent years of debt, the club was demoted to the Second Division in the 2011 season. It then disbanded and played its last game in 2011.

After 10 years, It was announced the club would be returning to the third division and in return back to professional football.

Honours

League
 Primera División Salvadorean and predecessors 
 Runners-up (1): 2004
 Segunda División Salvadorean and predecessors 
 Champions (2) : 2000, 2008
 Tercera División Salvadorean and predecessors 
 Champions (1) : N/A

Cups
Copa Presidente and predecessors 
 Champions (1) : 2006

Team captains

List of presidents
 Ricardo Flores
 Juan Pablo Robles (2003)
 Noel Benítez (2004, 2006–2007)
 Mario Sorto (2005)
 Andrés Alonso  Gómez (2007–2008)
 Juan Pablo Robles (2009–2011)

List of coaches

References

Association football clubs established in 1950
1950 establishments in El Salvador